The 2019–20 Plunket Shield was the 91st season of the Plunket Shield, the domestic first-class cricket competition in New Zealand. It took place between October 2019 and March 2020. As per the previous edition of the competition, the tournament was scheduled to feature eight rounds of matches. Central Districts were the defending champions.

In round two of the tournament, Michael Snedden became the first fourth-generation cricketer to play first-class cricket in New Zealand, when he made his debut for Wellington. In round five, Mark Chapman and Joe Carter scored centuries in both innings for Auckland, the first time that two batsman had scored a century in each innings in the same match in the Plunket Shield.

On 16 March 2020, the final two rounds of the tournament were cancelled, due to the COVID-19 pandemic. New Zealand Cricket announced that Wellington had won the tournament. It was Wellington's 21st title, and their first since the 2003–04 season.

Points table

 Champions

Fixtures

Round 1

Round 2

Round 3

Round 4

Round 5

Round 6

Round 7

Round 8

References

External links
 Series home at ESPN Cricinfo

Plunket Shield
2019–20 New Zealand cricket season
Plunket Shield
Plunket Shield season
Plunket Shield season